{{DISPLAYTITLE:C11H15NO}}
The molecular formula C11H15NO (molar mass :  177.24 g/mol, exact mass : 177.115364) may refer to:

 1-Aminomethyl-5-methoxyindane
 5-APDB
 6-APDB
 Buphedrone
 Ethcathinone
 Isoethcathinone
 Mephedrone
 Metamfepramone, a stimulant drug
 3-Methylmethcathinone
 MMAI
 Phenmetrazine
 Pseudophenmetrazine